The 1997 England rugby union tour of Argentina and Australia was a series of matches played in 1997 in Argentina and Australia by the England national rugby union team.

Over a total of 7 matches (6 in Argentina and one in Australia), England played three test (two vs Argentina, 1 win and 1 loss), and one v Australia).

Touring party
Manager: Jack Rowell
Coach:  Les Cusworth
Captain: Phil de Glanville

Matches summary

Match details

in Argentina 

Córdoba: Facundo Soler; José Luna. Germán Sagrera, Julián Légora, Gerardo Tomalino; Horacio Herrera, Christian Barrea; Damián Rotondo; Lucio Bedoya (Ohanián), Martín Viola (Luico Bedoya); José Simes, Eduardo Giaimo (Martín Fissore); Damián Muñoz, Guillermo Bernardi (c), Agustín Rodríguez Araya (Zárate).
England: Jim Mallinder; Jon Sleightholme, Phil de Glanville (c), Nick Greenstock, Adedayo Adebayo; Mike Catt, Kyran Bracken; Chris Sheasby (Tony Diprose); Rory Jenkins, Ben- Clarke; Nigel Redrnan, Martin Haag; Rob Hardwick, Phil Greening, Darren Garforth

Buenos Aires: Diego Cuesta Silva; Tomás Solar¡, José Orengo, Eduardo Simone, Octavio Bartolucci; José Cilley, Nicolás Fernández Miranda; Pablo Camerlinckx; Cristián Viel e Carlos Ignacio Fernández Lobbe; Roberto Petti, Pedro Sporleder; Marcelo Urbano, Juan José Angelillo (e),
Federico Werner.
England: Jim Mallinder; Jon Sleightholme, Nick Greenstock, Phil de Glanville (c)(Kyran Bracken), Adedayo Adebayo; Alex King (Mark Mapletoft), Andy Gomarsall; Tony Diprose; Ben Clarke (Martin Corry), Steve Ojornoh; Nigel Redrnan, Dave Baldwin; Kevin Yates, Richard Cockerill, John Mallett 

Argentina A: Federico Todeschini; Germán Todeschini, Julián Légora, Fernando del Castillo, Federico Schacht; José Cilley (c), Christian Barrea (Leandro Lobrauco); Cristián Viel; Roberto Travaglini, Gonzalo García; José Simes, Guillermo Ugartemendía (Raúl Pérez); Omar Hasan,
Mario Ledesma, Fernando Díaz Alberdi (Federico Werner)
England: Mark Mapletoft; Darren O'Leary, Jos Baxendell, Matt Allen, David Rees; Alex King (Mike Catt), Andy Gornarsall; Tony Diprose (e); Rory Jenkins (Steve Ojornoh), Martin Corry; Danny Grewcock, Martin Haag; Darren Garforth, Richard Cockerill, Kevin Yates (Rob Hardwick) 

Cuyo: Martín Castro; Matías Brandi, Federico Serpa, Leandro Speroni, Sergio Cantú (Enrique Gatti); Adrián Gioeni, Manuel Díaz; Juan Chiapetta; Miguel Bertranou (c), Fermín Rodríguez, Gonzalo Correa Llano, Roberto Marchiori (Carlos Bajach); Federico Stoerman, Juan Pablo Arnut (Alejandro Avila), Federico Bartolini.
England: Mark Mapletoft; Daren O'Leary, Matt Allen, Jos Baxendell, Adedayo Adebayo (Jim Mallinder); Alex King, Andy Gomarsall; Chris Sheasby (c)(Martin Corry); Rory Jenkins, Steve Ojornoh; David Baldwin, Danny Grewcock; Robin Hardwick, Steve Diamond, Will Green

in Australia

References

1997
1997
Tour
1997 in Argentine rugby union
1997 in Australian rugby union